José Marina Vega (13 April 1850 – 30 January 1926) was a Spanish military officer and politician. Leader of the military operations in Melilla during the 1909 Melilla Campaign, he later served as High Commissioner of Spain in Morocco (1913–1915) and as Minister of War (1917 and 1918).

Biography 
Born on 13 April 1850 in Figueres, province of Girona, he is sometimes reported to be born in 1848, as his father (a captain of the Spanish Armed Forces) declared him to be 2 years older in his application to the military. He moved as child to Luzon (Philippines). Returned to Peninsular Spain, he joined the Battalion of Hunters Llerena as cadet in 1863.

He fought in the Third Carlist War. With a military career in infantry, and promoted to colonel in 1893, Marina was destined to places such as Philippines and Cuba. He was promoted to the rank of brigader general in 1896. He was promoted to Divisional general in July 1900. Following a brief spell as civil governor in Barcelona (1899), he was destined to Melilla in 1905.

He was promoted then to Lieutenant general.

Appointed as High Commissioner of Spain in Morocco in replacement of Felipe Alfau Mendoza, he served from 1913 to 1915.

He served two times as Minister of War (1917 and 1918) in cabinets presided by Eduardo Dato and Antonio Maura. Appointed as senator for life in 1919, he died on 30 January 1926 in Madrid (Calle de Zurbano, 6).

References 

 Citations

 Bibliography
 
 
 
 

Defence ministers of Spain
Spanish lieutenant generals
1850 births
1926 deaths
Members of the Senate of Spain
Civil governors of Barcelona
Spanish military personnel of the Second Melillan campaign
Spanish military personnel of the Third Carlist War (Governmental faction)